The name Chicas Polar ("Polar Girls") refers to the models who have worked as image in the advertising campaign by Empresas Polar to promote one of their products in Venezuela: Polar Pilsen beer.
The campaign was launched for the first time in 2001 and has since then been renewed every year.
The billboards alongside the highways in Caracas and other places in the country are very popular, as well as the calendars with pictures shot in landscapes as Choroni Beach or rivers from la Gran Sabana.Since 2006, the girls are called "Chicas Pilsen" ("Pilsen Girls").

Chicas Polar by year 
The following table shows the models who have been part of the campaigns, alphabetically organized by last name.
The years where they have been part of the campaign are marked in gray.

References

External links 
Official site of the Polar Pilsen Beer and the Chicas Pilsen 

Advertising campaigns
Venezuelan female models